The National Union of Students (União Nacional dos Estudantes or UNE) is a student organization in Brazil. Founded on 11 August 1937, it represents more than 5 million students of higher education, and is headquartered in São Paulo, with branch offices in Rio de Janeiro and Goiás. Its main objective is to achieve education better conditions in the education sector. Although not officially linked to any political party, since 1980 it has been directed by members coming from the Communist Party of Brazil (PCdoB). In July 2019, the 57th Congress of the National Union of Students elected Iago Montalvão, an economics student at the University of São Paulo (USP), as its new president.

References

External links
 União Nacional dos Estudantes (UNE) official website

Students' unions in Brazil
Student organisations in Brazil
União Nacional dos Estudantes
Groups of students' unions
Student organizations established in 1938
1938 establishments in Brazil